An incomplete list of notable people have lived in or come from Northern Mariana Islands.

Athletics
 Mamiko Oshima-Berger
 Yvonne Bennett
 Jericho Cruz
 Jesus T. Iguel
 Sugao Kambe
 Clayton Kenty
 Koo Luam Khen
 Joe Wang Miller
 Beouch Ngirchongor
 Orrin Ogumoro Pharmin
 Jon Sakovich
 Zarinae Sapong
 Kiyoshi Sekiguchi
 Colin Sinclair
 Chikashi Suzuki
 Rezne Wong

Business
 Vicente Camacho
 Larry Hillblom
 Jose Camacho Tenorio

Lawyer
 Gilbert Birnbrich
 Jesus Borja
 Edward Buckingham
 Joe Camacho
 Miguel S. Demapan
 Matthew Gregory
 Ramona Villagomez Manglona
 Edward Manibusan
 Alex R. Munson
 Joey San Nicolas

Military
 David Borja

Politics
 Francisco Ada
 James Ada
 Juan Babauta
 Carlos S. Camacho
 Benigno Fitial
 Josie Fitial
 Donald Flores
 Juan Pan Guerrero
 Lorenzo I. De Leon Guerrero
 Ramon Deleon Guerrero
 Heinz Hofschneider
 Jude Hofschneider
 Victor Hocog
 Alice Santos Igitol
 Eloy Inos
 Rita Inos
 Benjamin Manglona
 Janet Maratita
 Felicidad Ogumoro
 Maria Frica Pangelinan
 Jose Santos Rios
 Gregorio Sablan
 Teresita Santos
 Froilan Tenorio
 Pedro Tenorio
 Ralph Torres
 Timothy Villagomez
 Juan B. Tudela

Other
 Tomas Aguon Camacho
 Ryan Jimenez
 Valentine Namio Sengebau

References

People

Northern Mariana Islands
Northern Mariana Islands
Northern Mariana Islands